Lago di Santa Rosalia is an artificial lake in the Province of Ragusa, Sicily, Italy.

Dam
The lake was created following the completion of building works of a dam 57,10m tall along the higher part of the course of the river Irminio, between the towns of Ragusa and Giarratana. Works started the 10 November 1976 and were completed in 1983. The water reservoir was created for agricultural use but is also used for recreational fishing.

The Lago di Santa Rosalia is the only lake of the province of Ragusa.

Lakes of Sicily